Jermaine Fowler is an American actor, comedian, producer and writer. He is perhaps best known for his role as King Akeem Joffer's long-lost son Lavelle Junson in the 2021 romantic comedy film Coming 2 America and Franco Wicks on the CBS sitcom television series Superior Donuts.

Early life
The second oldest of four children, Fowler and his twin brother were born in Washington, D.C. and raised in Hyattsville, Maryland, where he graduated from Northwestern High School. Fowler dropped out of college at age 20 and moved to New York City. By day he job-searched and by night he performed at open mics in Times Square.

Career

2012–2015: Comic Special
In 2012, he began touring the country performing at comedy clubs and colleges. In 2013, he was cast in MTV2's Guy Code and writing, producing, and starring in his own pilots. In 2014, he starred in Friends of the People which lasted two seasons on TruTV. In 2015, Fowler produced and starred in his debut comedy special, "Give 'Em Hell, Kid", that he licensed to Showtime.

Superior Donuts
In 2017, Fowler became an executive producer and star of the CBS sitcom Superior Donuts. The show's popularity led to it being renewed for a second season on March 23, 2017. The series was formally cancelled after two seasons. He also has a recurring role on HBO's Crashing.

On September 17, 2017, Fowler was the announcer of the 69th Annual Primetime Emmy Awards.

Filmography
Guy Code (2012)
The Eric Andre Show (2012)
Funny or Die Presents (2013)
Lucas Bros. Moving Co. (2014–2015)
BoJack Horseman (2014)
Comedy Underground with Dave Attell (2014)
Friends of the People (2014)
Delores and Jermaine (2015)
Robot Chicken (2015)
Give 'Em Hell, Kid (Standup Comedy Show, 2016)
Morris and the Cow (2016)
Crashing (2017)
Family Guy (2017)
 Lip Sync Battle (2017)
Superior Donuts (2017–2018)
Sorry to Bother You (2018)
Buffaloed (2019)
 The Opening Act (2020)
 RuPaul's Secret Celebrity Drag Race (2020)
 Match Game (2020)
 Judas and the Black Messiah (2021)
 Coming 2 America (2021)
 RuPaul's Drag Race: All Stars 6 (2021)
 Moon Girl and Devil Dinosaur (2022)
 Tuca & Bertie (2022)
 Am I Ok? (2022)
 The Blackening (2022)
Riverdance: The Animated Adventure (2021)

Late Bloomers (2023)

References

External links

 

1988 births
20th-century African-American people
21st-century American comedians
21st-century African-American people
African-American male actors
African-American male comedians
American male comedians
American male writers
American film producers
Living people
People from Washington, D.C.
People from Hyattsville, Maryland